Ho Chi Minh City Hall, officially called the Ho Chi Minh City People's Committee Head Office (Trụ sở Ủy ban Nhân dân Thành phố Hồ Chí Minh) is the city hall of Ho Chi Minh City, Vietnam. 

The hall was built in 1902–1908 in a French colonial style by architect Paul Gardès. Since 1975, the building has housed the Ho Chi Minh City People's Committee, Ho Chi Minh City People's Council and Ho Chi Minh City People's Court. 

Although the building is not open to the public, it is popular for its photo opportunities. Tourists can take photographs outside and many people choose to do this at night when the building and its grounds are lit up. 

Other buildings nearby:

 Municipal Theatre, Ho Chi Minh City
 HSBC Building, Ho Chi Minh City
 Rex Hotel, Ho Chi Minh City

References

External links
 Photos of Ho Chi Minh City Hall
 Ho Chi Minh City Hall
 Ho Chi Minh City Hall

Buildings and structures in Ho Chi Minh City
Tourist attractions in Ho Chi Minh City
Clock towers in Vietnam
French colonial architecture in Vietnam
Office buildings in Vietnam
Government buildings completed in 1908
Seats of local government
1908 establishments in Vietnam